Bill or Billy Phillips may refer to:

Entertainment
 Bill Phillips (singer) (1936–2010), country music singer from the 1950s and 1960s
 Bill Phillips (author) (born 1964), fitness and nutrition author
 Billy Phillips (TV personality), Geordie Shore participant

Sports
 Bill Phillips (first baseman) (1857–1900), Canadian baseball player
 Bill Phillips (pitcher) (1868–1941), American baseball pitcher and manager
 Bill Phillips (ice hockey) (1902–1998), ice hockey player
 Bill Phillips (rugby union) (1914–1982), New Zealand rugby union player
 Billy Phillips (born 1956), American soccer player

See also
William Phillips (disambiguation)